Maja Hug (born 5 April 1928) is a Swiss figure skater. She was born in Zürich. She is a six-time (1945–1950) Swiss national champion. She represented Switzerland at the 1948 Winter Olympics where she placed 15th. Hug held the record for most Swiss national titles won by a woman until Sarah Meier won her seventh national title in the 2007-2008 season.

Competitive highlights

References

 
 List of Historical Swiss Champions

1928 births
Living people
Swiss female single skaters
Olympic figure skaters of Switzerland
Figure skaters at the 1948 Winter Olympics
Figure skaters from Zürich